Dr. Gergely "Gergő" Kiss (born 21 September 1977) is a Hungarian former water polo player. He was considered to be one of the best left-handed water polo players of his time. Kiss is one of six male athletes who won three Olympic gold medals in water polo. He played on the right side, but moved to 2-meters on offense sometimes.

Kiss dominated internationally in the 2004 Olympics in Athens, especially in final match against Serbia and Montenegro. The Hungarian team was not at its best in the first quarter, but Kiss was able to score thrice, helping them to keep up with their opponent. After the Hungarian side came back to tie the game in the fourth quarter, Kiss put in the game-winning goal on a 'power play' opportunity. He was voted to be in the all-star team along with teammate Tamás Kásás. Kiss first became known internationally at Olympic level during the 2000 Olympics in Sydney helping Hungary win gold in the finals.

Kiss, nicknamed Geri, was greatly influenced by his coach Dénes Kemény. He finished studying law in 2005.

Honours

National
 Olympic Games:  Gold medal - 2000, 2004, 2008
 World Championships:  Gold medal - 2003;  Silver medal - 1998, 2005, 2007
 European Championship:  Gold medal - 1997, 1999;  Silver medal - 2006;  Bronze medal - 2001, 2003, 2008, 2012
 FINA World League:  Gold medal - 2003, 2004;  Silver medal - 2007;  Bronze medal - 2002
 FINA World Cup:  Gold medal - 1999;  Silver medal - 2002, 2006;  Bronze medal - 1997
 Junior World Championships: (Gold medal - 1995; Silver medal - 1997)
 Junior European Championship: (Gold medal - 1994)

Club
 Euroleague Winners (3): (1998 - with Posillipo; 2004 - with Bp. Honvéd; 2009 - with Primorac Kotor)
 LEN Cup Winners (1): (1999 - with UTE)
 LEN Super Cup Winner (2): (2004 - with Bp. Honvéd; 2009 - with Primorac Kotor)
 Hungarian Championship (OB I): 6x (2002, 2003, 2004, 2005, 2006 - with Bp. Honvéd; 2012 - with Vasas)
 Hungarian Cup (Magyar Kupa): 2x (1997 - with FTC; 2006 - with Bp. Honvéd)
 Hungarian SuperCup (Szuperkupa): 1x (2005 - with Bp. Honvéd)
 Montenegrin Cup (Kup Crne Gore): 1x (2010 - with Primorac Kotor)

Awards
 Masterly youth athlete: 1995, 1996, 1997
 Member of the Hungarian team of year: 1997, 1999, 2000, 2003, 2004, 2008
 Golden cap (2000, 2004)
 Honorary Citizen of Budapest (2008)
 Hungarian Water Polo Player of the Year: 2009
 Ministerial Certificate of Merit (2012)
 Member of International Swimming Hall of Fame (2015)

Orders
   Officer's Cross of the Order of Merit of the Republic of Hungary (2000)
   Commander's Cross of the Order of Merit of the Republic of Hungary (2004)
   Commander's Cross of the Order of Merit of the Republic of Hungary with the Star (2008)

See also
 Hungary men's Olympic water polo team records and statistics
 List of multiple Olympic gold medalists in one event
 List of Olympic champions in men's water polo
 List of Olympic medalists in water polo (men)
 List of players who have appeared in multiple men's Olympic water polo tournaments
 List of men's Olympic water polo tournament top goalscorers
 List of world champions in men's water polo
 List of World Aquatics Championships medalists in water polo
 List of members of the International Swimming Hall of Fame

References

External links
 
 

1977 births
Living people
Water polo players from Budapest
Hungarian male water polo players
Water polo drivers
Left-handed water polo players
Water polo players at the 2000 Summer Olympics
Water polo players at the 2004 Summer Olympics
Water polo players at the 2008 Summer Olympics
Water polo players at the 2012 Summer Olympics
Medalists at the 2000 Summer Olympics
Medalists at the 2004 Summer Olympics
Medalists at the 2008 Summer Olympics
Olympic gold medalists for Hungary in water polo
World Aquatics Championships medalists in water polo
Vasas SC water polo players
Recipients of the Order of Merit of the Republic of Hungary
20th-century Hungarian people
21st-century Hungarian people